Talk in Berlin was a weekly talk show on the German news channel n-tv hosted by Erich Böhme and Klaus Bresser.

Exactly one year after the end of Talk im Turm, its long-time presenter Erich Böhme returned to television with an almost identical show on the news channel n-tv. He talked with four to five guests each about a current political topic. The program was 90 minutes long and ran on Sundays from 9.30 pm.

n-tv stopped the show at the end of 2003 due to financial reasons, but also program optimization would have played a role in this decision.

Hosts
Erich Böhme (2000–2002)
Klaus Bresser (2002–2003)

References

External links

2000 German television series debuts
2003 German television series endings
2000 establishments in Germany
2003 disestablishments in Germany
German-language television shows
N-tv original programming